Malaxis monophyllos, the white adder's mouth, is a terrestrial species of orchid. It is widespread across much of Europe (Germany, Italy, Poland, Scandinavia, Ukraine, etc.), Asia (China, Japan, Russia, Nepal, Philippines, etc.), and much of southern Canada. In the United States, it grows mostly in southern Alaska, New England and the Great Lakes region, with isolated populations reported from Colorado and California.

References

External links
IOSPE orchid photos
Orchids of Wisconsin, Malaxis monophyllos (L.) Sw. var. brachypoda (Gray) Morris & Eames
Calflora, California taxon report, University of California, Malaxis monophyllos  (L.) Sw.  var. brachypoda  (A. Gray) F. Morris & Eames
Minnesota State Department of Natural Resources
 
Go Orchids, North American Orchid Conservation Center
AGEO Orchideen der Schweiz, Malaxis monophyllos, Einblatt,  Malaxis à une feuille,  Microstile
Botany Czech, Malaxis monophyllos (L.) Swartz – měkčilka jednolistá / trčníček jednolistý
Flickr photo, Malaxis monophyllos growing high in the Alps
Manitoba Native Orchids Society, orchids compendium, White Adder's - mouth (Malaxis monophyllos var brachypoda (Gray) Fernald)
Plantarium, Malaxis monophyllos (L.) Sw. , Описание таксона, Русскоязычные названия
Eesti Orchideekaitse Klubi, Estonian Orchid Protection Club, Malaxis monophyllos, ainulehine sookäpp

monophyllos
Plants described in 1753
Taxa named by Carl Linnaeus
Orchids of North America
Orchids of Asia
Orchids of Europe